Raphael Gray (born 1981 in Lambeth, London) is a British computer hacker who, at the age of 19, hacked computer systems around the world over a period of six weeks as part of a multi-million pound credit card mission. He then proceeded to publish credit card details of over 6,500 cards as an example of weak security in the growing number of consumer websites.

Biography
Gray was able to break into the secure systems using an £800 computer he bought in his home town Clynderwen, Pembrokeshire, Wales.  After publishing the credit card info on his websites, Gray posted a personal message saying law enforcers would never find him "because they never catch anyone. The police can't hack their way out of a paper bag."  He also sent Viagra tablets to Bill Gates' address and then published what he claimed to be the billionaire's own number.

He was tracked down by ex-hacker Chris Davis who was insulted by Gray's "arrogance".  It took Davis under a day to find Gray's information, which he then forwarded to the FBI. "The FBI was actually quite easy to deal with, although technically, they didn't really understand what it was I was explaining to them. The local police were also very polite, but they didn't understand it," said Davis.  Gray was arrested when FBI agents and officers from the local Dyfed Powys Police turned up at the door of his home, which he shared with his mother, brother and sister in March 2000.

Family
Raphael is the great-great-grandson of Arthur von Hippel (physician). His father died when he was a very young child, meaning he was raised solely by his mother.

See also
List of convicted computer criminals

References

External links
PBS Interview with Raphael Gray

1981 births
British computer criminals
English people of German descent
English people of Ugandan descent
Living people
People from Lambeth
People on the autism spectrum
People with traumatic brain injuries